Phidiana hiltoni is a species of sea slug, an aeolid nudibranch, a shell-less marine gastropod mollusc in the family Facelinidae.

Distribution
This species has a rather limited range of distribution, being found from the central California coast to Baja California, Mexico, and it is also found in the Gulf of Mexico. Recently, its range has been extending north and is now found north of San Francisco Bay.

Description
This nudibranch grows to 50 mm, or a little more than 2 inches in length. The reddish or brownish line across its head is almost always present, and is very characteristic of the species.

This species can be confused with Hermissenda crassicornis, which is superficially similar in appearance.

Life habits
This solid nudibranch species is considered to be rather aggressive, often biting and fighting with other nudibranchs, including members of its own species.

References

  Goddard, J. H. R.; Gosliner, T. M.; Pearse, J. S. (2011). Impacts associated with the recent range shift of the aeolid nudibranch Phidiana hiltoni (Mollusca, Opisthobranchia) in California. Marine Biology. 158, 1095-1109
 Pacific Coast Nudibranchs, 1980, Dave Behrens, Sea Challenger Books, California

External links

 Sea Slug Forum factsheet: 
 Slug Site: 

Facelinidae
Gastropods described in 1927